Ubiquant is a Beijing-based hedge fund and artificial intelligence (AI) company founded in 2012. It is one of the largest quantitative funds in China.

Background 

Ubiquant was founded in 2012 by Wang Chen and Yao Qicong, former WorldQuant researchers. When Ubiquant first started it was mainly a self-operated commodity trading advisor.

In 2014, Ubiquant completed its registration with the Asset Management Association of China.

In 2016, Ubiquant launched its full asset management business which featured a wider product line including enhanced indexing and quantitative long/short equity strategies.

In 2018, Ubiquant started moving toward using AI methods under big data to drive transactions.

From 2019 to early 2020, Ubiquant established its own AI laboratory called AI LAB and built a technical team to research the use of AI to come up with new trading strategies and products. It has also built a data laboratory.

In November 2021, a SFC regulated subsidiary named Ubiquant Asset Management Co., Limited was established in Hong Kong.

In January 2022, the Ubiquant Asia Pacific Quantitative Hedge Fund fell 39% although it rebounded with more than a 20% gain in February.

Ubiquant is stationed near Tsinghua University. It has additional offices in Shanghai and Shenzhen which were established in 2017 and 2020 respectively.

Hiring process 

According to Bloomberg News, Ubiquant has offered annual salaries of up to $300,000 to attract recent graduates from the fields of artificial intelligence and computer science. Graduate students have dropped out of their PhD programs at American universities to join the company. Ubiquant has offered more experienced candidates annual salaries of $1 million.  Extra incentives are given such as one time bonuses or profit sharing from trading strategies. The hiring process is vigorous and selective where candidates are tested on many areas such as coding and statistics and their academic research papers are also examined. In 2020, ten fresh graduates were hired by the company.

See also 

 Hedge fund industry in China

References

External links
 

Chinese companies established in 2012
Companies based in Beijing
Financial services companies established in 2012
Hedge funds
Investment management companies of China
Technology companies established in 2012